Christmas Day and Christmas Eve games in the National Football League (NFL) are an occasional part of the league's schedule. In contrast to Thanksgiving Day games, however, they are not an annual occurrence, since Thanksgiving is always on a Thursday while Christmas Eve and Christmas Day, December 24–25, can fall at any day of the week. The NFL held two Divisional Playoff games on Christmas Day in  when the regular season only spanned a 14-week period. This proved unpopular, and the league avoided any more games on Christmas Day until . Since then, the NFL has occasionally held games on Christmas Eve and Christmas Day in some years, as part of week 16 or 17 of the regular season.

As of the end of the 2022 season, there have been 27 Christmas Day games in the NFL's history, all broadcast nationally.

The NFL has typically scheduled games on Christmas Day, December 25, if it falls on a Saturday, Sunday, or Monday. When Christmas Day falls on a Saturday, then it would just be part of the normal slate of the handful of Saturday NFL games held during the final weeks of every regular season. If Christmas Day falls on a Sunday, then the normal slate of Sunday afternoon games is instead played on Saturday, Christmas Eve, and one of the Christmas Day games will include the standard Sunday Night Football telecast. When Christmas Day falls on a Monday, the normal slate of Sunday afternoon games is still played on Christmas Eve, and Monday Night Football on Christmas night, but the Sunday Night Football telecast has been moved to either Monday afternoon or to Saturday, December 23. There have been rare instances of Christmas Day games held on a Friday and Christmas Eve games on a Thursday.

History

Early years
In the earliest days of professional football, the season typically ended near the end of November (marquee games were often played on Thanksgiving) or in the first week of December, depending on the team; exhibition games would then be held in the winter. Once league schedules were standardized in the 1930s, the NFL Championship Game was typically held in mid-December. The 1943 NFL Championship Game, played on December 26 of that year because of scheduling complications brought on by World War II, was the first regulation NFL game to be played on or after Christmas.

From 1943 until the 1970 AFL-NFL Merger, the NFL regular season usually ended in mid-December, with the NFL Championship Game being held on the Sunday two weeks later. If that Sunday fell on Christmas Day December 25, the league preferred to move it to the following day, Monday, December 26; this rescheduling occurred for both the 1955 and the 1960 championship games.

The American Football League compensated differently: the 1960 championship game was moved back by a full week, being played on New Year's Day 1961, with Christmas Sunday being an off-week. (The NFL's 1966 championship game was also held on Sunday, January 1, 1967, two weeks after the end of the regular season.) New Year's Day was an available day since the college bowl games are moved back to Monday, January 2 in years in which January 1 falls on a Sunday. The AFL had scheduled the 1966 championship game for Monday afternoon December 26, but when the two leagues agreed to merge in 1970 and play a "World Championship game" starting with the 1966 season, the AFL game was moved back to Sunday, January 1.

1971 Divisional Playoffs
The first NFL games actually played on December 25 came after the merger, during the 1971–72 NFL playoffs. The first two games of the Divisional Playoff Round were held on Christmas Day; the first of these was between the Dallas Cowboys and the Minnesota Vikings, while the second of the two contests played that afternoon, the Miami Dolphins versus the Kansas City Chiefs, wound up being the longest game in NFL history. Because of the length of the latter game, the NFL received numerous complaints, reportedly due to the fact that it caused havoc with Christmas dinners around the nation. The league also came under fire from some quarters for intruding on a traditional religious and family holiday, and a Kansas state legislator proposed a bill to ban the scheduling of future games on December 25. As a result, the NFL decided to not schedule any Christmas Day games for the next 17 seasons.

Avoiding Christmas
This required considerable effort during those years in which Christmas fell on a Saturday or a Sunday, given that ordinarily those days would be days in which NFL playoff games were to be held.

In , the NFL opened its regular season a week earlier than would have ordinarily been the case (September 12, the second Sunday of the month, rather than the customary third Sunday) so that the Divisional Playoffs could be held on December 18 and 19 instead of December 25 and 26, and thus no games would be needed on Saturday, December 25 (Super Bowl XI was subsequently played on January 9, the earliest date in Super Bowl history).

In , with Christmas falling on a Sunday, the Divisional Playoff Games were held around the holiday, with an AFC doubleheader on Saturday, December 24, and an NFC doubleheader on Monday, December 26. This was done so that one team did not have a two-day rest advantage over the other for the Conference Championship games (the NFL only allowed one-day rest advantages). This scheduling resulted in most of the country missing the majority of the 1st quarter of the Pittsburgh Steelers-Denver Broncos game telecast (beginning at 4:00 p.m. EST), since the early AFC game that Saturday (Oakland Raiders-Baltimore Colts, beginning at 12:30 p.m. EST) went into double overtime; with an ordinary schedule of one game from each conference, viewers would have had the option of switching channels (or using a VCR) but in this case NBC simply stayed with the Raiders-Colts game (except in the Pittsburgh and Denver markets) and had to overlap its telecasts.

The NFL continued to avoid Christmas even after it started to extend the length of the regular season and the playoffs. It was originally scheduled to end on Sunday, December 26 of that year, but the regular season was extended to Sunday, January 2, 1983 after the 57-day NFL players' strike reduced the season from 16 games to 9; the NFL compensated by extending the regular season one week and eliminating the off week between the conference championships and the Super Bowl.

Had the United States Football League (USFL) survived to play its autumn 1986 season, it would have featured the first major professional football games to be played in the regular season on Christmas; the USFL planned a complete set of four games for Christmas Day. The USFL suspended operations prior to the 1986 season and the games were never played.

Regular season games on Christmas
EST Monday Night Football contest on ABC, thereby avoiding interfering with family dinners. The NFL pushed the regular season back one week in 1989 as a one-off experiment, meaning Christmas would fall during the last week of the regular season instead of the first round of the playoffs. In the years since, the NFL has played an occasional late-afternoon or night game on the holiday, but the league did not schedule a Christmas Day game starting earlier than 3:30 p.m. local time (for either participating team) from 1971 through 2021.

The league has generally played one or two games on Christmas Day when the holiday falls on a Saturday, Sunday, or Monday. If Christmas Day falls on a Saturday, then it would just be part of the normal slate of the handful of Saturday games during the final weeks of the regular season. Since 1994, if Christmas Day falls on a Sunday, then most of the usual Sunday afternoon games are instead played on Saturday, Christmas Eve. The league also played rare Friday games on Christmas Day in 2009 and 2020, both of which were considered special editions of Thursday Night Football.

The CBS game included an alternate, youth-oriented broadcast on sister network Nickelodeon, after having previously aired Wild Card games in such a manner. 

Under the NFL's next round of television deals reached in March 2021, which will begin in 2023 and run through 2033, Fox acquired the rights to air special Christmas Day games as the schedule permits. These special Christmas games are in addition to standard primetime games on Christmas (such as Sunday Night Football and Monday Night Football in years in which Christmas lands on those days).

All-time results

1971 playoff games

Regular season

Christmas Day standings
By franchise (through the 2022 games)

Christmas Eve
These games have typically been played early in the afternoon out of deference to the holiday. If Christmas Day falls on a Sunday (most recently in ), then most of the weekend's NFL games will be on the afternoon of Christmas Eve, except for a few games played on Thursday, Sunday, or Monday night in the league's regular prime-time television packages.

The 2004 season featured a Christmas Eve matchup on Friday afternoon, one of the rare instances when the league has played on Friday. The game (Green Bay Packers at Minnesota Vikings for the NFC North title) aired on Fox; the Packers defeated the Vikings 34–31. Prior to that, the last Christmas Eve Friday game was played in  when the New Orleans Saints defeated the Dallas Cowboys.

In 2006, while the regular slate of afternoon games was played, no Sunday night game was scheduled. Instead, two games were played on Monday, Christmas Day. NBC, which was under contract to air the Sunday night game, aired the first Christmas Day game pitting the Philadelphia Eagles against the Dallas Cowboys at Texas Stadium, with a 5:00 p.m. EST kickoff (it is the only Monday game called by longtime Monday Night Football announcer Al Michaels since the move of Monday Night Football to ESPN and his move to NBC). ESPN followed at 8:30 p.m. with the New York Jets and Miami Dolphins on Monday Night Football. In , the normal Sunday Night Football game was moved to Saturday, December 23 and no Christmas Eve game was played (on Christmas Day, Monday, there was a special Thursday Night Football on NBC and NFL Network, along with the standard Monday Night Football game).

In , Christmas Eve landed on a Monday. This proved especially problematic; from 2007 to 2021 the league's television contract with ESPN required the league to provide 17 Monday Night Football games over the course of the first 16 weeks of the season (the league no longer schedules a Monday night game for the final weekend of the season). In seasons' past, the league compensated for an instance like this by giving ESPN or ABC an extra Saturday or Thursday night game later in the season, but this was no longer possible because the new television contract gave the rights to those games to NFL Network. Thus, with the league already stretching its limits by placing a Monday night doubleheader on opening weekend, this meant that every available Monday night would have to air at least one game, even if it were Christmas Eve. To ease the issue, the game was scheduled between two Western teams, the Denver Broncos at the San Diego Chargers, so that the game could start at 5:00 p.m. local time. Such a situation will next occur in 2029.

In , no game was scheduled on December 24, opting instead to hold a special edition of Thursday Night Football on Christmas Day (see above). In , the NFL scheduled a Thursday Night Football game between the San Diego Chargers and the Oakland Raiders, again two west coast teams, with the game starting at 5:00 p.m. local time, and no games scheduled on Christmas Day.

For , Christmas Eve fell on a Saturday. A reduced slate of 11 afternoon games were scheduled on Christmas Eve, and a special edition of Thursday Night Football aired on NFL Network between the Cincinnati Bengals and the Houston Texans. The game started at 7:25 p.m. local time in Houston marking the latest NFL game played on Christmas Eve. The league followed suit for 2022; this time, NFL Network scheduled a rare East coast primetime game on Christmas Eve, featuring the Las Vegas Raiders at the Pittsburgh Steelers to commemorate the 50th anniversary of the Immaculate Reception.

References

Christmas
Christmas in the United States
Christmas events and celebrations